The 1984 New Zealand general election was a nationwide vote to determine the composition of the 41st New Zealand Parliament. It marked the beginning of the Fourth Labour Government, with David Lange's Labour Party defeating the long-serving Prime Minister, Robert Muldoon, of the National Party. It was also the last election in which the Social Credit Party won seats as an independent entity. The election was also the only one in which the New Zealand Party, a protest party, played any substantial role.

A snap election, Muldoon called for it a month prior. When doing so he was both live on television and visibly drunk, leading to the election being dubbed the "schnapps election".

Background
Before the election, the National Party governed with 47 seats, a small majority. The opposition Labour Party held 43 seats, and the Social Credit Party held two. Although National theoretically commanded a two-seat lead over the other parties, dissent within the National caucus (particularly by Marilyn Waring and Mike Minogue) resulted in serious problems for National leader Robert Muldoon. Muldoon felt that he could no longer maintain a majority until the end of the sitting year.

The 1984 election was called when Marilyn Waring told Muldoon that she would not support his government in the vote over an opposition-sponsored anti-nuclear bill. Muldoon, visibly drunk, announced a snap election on national television on the night of 14 June. It is believed that Muldoon's behaviour was also the result of a number of personal factors, including, not least, tiredness and frustration, but alcohol and diabetes also, issues that had been plaguing him for some time. Muldoon's drunkenness while making the announcement led to the election being nicknamed the "schnapps election".

There is debate over whether the election was necessary — Waring had not threatened to block confidence and supply, meaning that the government could still have continued on even if it had lost the anti-nuclear vote. Nevertheless, Muldoon appears to have wanted an election to reinforce his mandate (just as Sidney Holland sought and won a mandate to oppose striking dock-workers with the 1951 snap election).

Muldoon's government, which had been growing increasingly unpopular in its third term, was seen as rigid, inflexible, and increasingly unresponsive to public concerns. The Labour Party had actually gained a plurality of the vote in the previous two elections, but had narrowly missed out on getting a majority of the seats. Labour's primary campaign message was one of change — Muldoon's government, which employed wage and price controls in an attempt to "guide" the economy, was widely blamed for poor economic performance. Labour also campaigned to reduce government borrowing, and to enact nuclear-free policy.

The New Zealand Party, founded by property tycoon Bob Jones, was launched primarily to oppose the Muldoon government (although it did not support Labour). A right-wing liberal party, it promoted less government control over markets, in contrast to the paternalist and somewhat authoritarian policies of National, the other significant right-wing party.

MPs retiring in 1984
Seven National MPs and two Labour MPs intended to retire at the end of the 40th Parliament.

Electoral changes
The 1983 electoral redistribution was even more politically influenced than the previous one in 1977. The Labour Party believed it had been disadvantaged in 1977 and it was not to let this happen again. Every proposal was put to intense scrutiny, and this resulted in the electoral redistribution taking forty-one working days; the average length of the five previous redistributions was eight. As Social Credit had two MPs, the Labour Party nominee on the commission formally represented that party, which further increased tensions. The 1981 census had shown that the North Island had experienced further population growth, and three additional general seats were created, bringing the total number of electorates to 95. The South Island had, for the first time, experienced a population loss, but its number of general electorates was fixed at 25 since the 1967 electoral redistribution. More of the South Island population was moving to Christchurch, and two electorates were abolished ( and ), while two electorates were recreated ( and ). In the North Island, six electorates were newly created (and ), three electorates were recreated (and ), and six electorates were abolished (and ).

The election
The election was held on 14 July. There were 2,111,651 registered voters. Turnout was 93.7%, the highest turnout ever recorded in a New Zealand election. Most political scientists attribute the high turnout to a desire by voters for change.

Immediately after the election there was a constitutional crisis when Muldoon initially refused to follow the advice of the incoming Labour government and devalue the New Zealand Dollar.

Summary of results

The 1984 election saw the Labour Party win 56 of the 95 seats in parliament, a gain of 13. This was enough for it to hold an outright majority and form the fourth Labour government. The National Party won only 37 seats, a loss of ten. The New Zealand Party, despite winning 12.2% of the vote, failed to gain any seats at all. Social Credit managed to win two seats, the same number as it had held previously. The Values Party, an environmentalist group, gained fifth place, but no seats.

There were 95 seats being contested in the 1984 election, three more than in the previous parliament. All but two of these seats were won by one of the two major parties.

The Labour Party, previously in opposition, won 56 seats, an outright majority. Most of the seats won by Labour were in urban areas, following the party's typical pattern. Exceptions to this general trend include the eastern tip of the North Island and the western coast of the South Island. Labour's strongest regions were the Wellington area (where the party won every seat), as well as Auckland, Christchurch and Dunedin (cities in which it won most seats). Smaller cities such as Hamilton, Nelson, Napier, Hastings and Palmerston North were also won by Labour. As expected, Labour also won all four Māori seats, maintaining its traditional strength there.

The National Party, the incumbent government, was (as expected) strongest in rural areas. Most of the rural North Island was won by National, as were most of the rural areas on the South Island's eastern coast. In the larger cities, the party fared poorly, with Auckland and Christchurch being the only places that the party won seats. It was more successful in smaller cities, however, winning Rotorua, Tauranga, Invercargill, New Plymouth and Whangarei. It was placed second in two Māori electorates, and third in the other two.

The only minor party to win electorates was the Social Credit Party, which won East Coast Bays and Pakuranga (both in Auckland). It had held East Coast Bays before the election, but won Pakuranga for the first time. It did not manage to retain Rangitikei, which it had also held before the election. Social Credit candidates were placed second in six electorates, including Rangitikei.

The New Zealand Party, despite gaining more votes than Social Credit, did not win any seats. Some commentators have suggested that the party was not seeking to do so, and instead was merely acting as a spoiler for National. This impression has been backed up by comments by Bob Jones himself. The party was, however, placed second in the electorates of Remuera (an affluent part of Auckland), Kaimai, and Tauranga.

The Values Party, an environmentalist group, managed to win 0.2% of the vote, substantially below previous efforts. The party, which was in slow decline, would eventually vanish, but its ideals and goals would be reborn in the Green Party.

In two of the Māori electorates, the Mana Motuhake party gained second place, but the party did not gain a substantial number of votes elsewhere.

No independent candidates won seats, but one independent candidate, Mel Courtney, was placed second in the electorate of Nelson.

Detailed results

Party results

Votes summary

Electorate results
The tables below shows the results of the 1984 general election:

Key

|-
 |colspan=8 style="background-color:#FFDEAD" | General electorates
|-

|-
 | Hauraki
 | style="background-color:;" |
 | colspan=3 style="text-align:center;background-color:;" | Graeme Lee
 | style="text-align:right;" | 3,432
 | style="background-color:;" |
 | style="text-align:center;" | Alisdair Thompson
|-

|-
 |colspan=8 style="background-color:#FFDEAD" | Māori electorates
|-

|}
Table footnotes:

Summary of changes
Eleven new seats were created, of which seven (Christchurch North, Dunedin West, Glenfield, Otara, Panmure, Tongariro and West Auckland) were won by Labour, and four (Franklin, Raglan, Rodney and Waikaremoana) by National.
A further ten seats were won by Labour from National: East Cape, Eden, Hamilton East, Hamilton West, Hawkes Bay, Horowhenua, Ohariu, Wairarapa and Waitaki. Social Credit lost Rangitikei to National.  National also lost Pakuranga to Social Credit.
Nine electorates had incumbent MPs retire and replaced them with MPs from the same party, six National and three Labour. Kaipara, Rangiora, Taranaki, Tauranga, Waikato and Waipa remained National, while Sydenham, Tasman and Yaldhurst remained Labour. In Rangiora, National MP Derek Quigley's decision not to stand for re-election followed serious clashes with Muldoon over economic policy, while in Sydenham, John Kirk had resigned from the Labour Party.

Major policy platforms

Labour Party 

 Central aims
 "A society where people don't feel challenged to be nasty about everyone else" – David Lange. Drawn together to work for the interests of their country, a chance for everyone to have a chance to be equal, in education, society and jobs (regardless of gender or race). A programme of moderation and realism.
 State of economy
 To take stock of the overseas debt, focus on the unemployment rates. To target money into jobs which use New Zealand resources which turn our primary production into a higher value product. Using tourism as an employment generator. Assigning resources to small businesses and enterprises.
 Nuclear issues
 Opposed to nuclear testing. Keeping New Zealand defended without nuclear propelled vessels. Discuss with the allies and traders moving forward nuclear free,
 Prices, Incomes and industrial
 Industrial relations policy government boss and worker have to fix limits, bargaining, you cannot have country where prices can soar and wages are screwed down.

National Party 

 Central aims
 To get New Zealand through difficult times with success. To deal with political issues sensibly and realistically in a way that is based on practical rather than theoretical considerations. Match taxation to promises.
 State of economy
 Continue to tackle problems at their source, support for wage and price freezes. To adopt a business mindset, use overseas borrowing for huge projects to get net earnings.
 Nuclear issues
 Opposed to nuclear testing and weapons. Opposed to making them, using them or storing them. ANZUS nuclear propelled vessels are permitted to keep the ANZUS treaty.
 Prices, Incomes and industrial
 Wage and price freeze will work, it's what the public wants. Long term wage-fixing system, agreement with unions and employers.

Further reading 
 Nuclear context: New Zealand nuclear-free zone#Historical background
 Economic context: Think Big

Notes

References

 
November 1984 events in New Zealand